The Arctic was a wooden hulled  tugboat that worked on the Great Lakes of North America from 1881 to 1930. In 1930 the Arctic was stripped of her machinery, and abandoned at Manitowoc, Wisconsin. On June 22, 2018, the remains of the Arctic were listed on the National Register of Historic Places.

History
The Arctic was built in 1881 by Rand & Burger of Manitowoc, Wisconsin. She had a gross register tonnage of 52 tons, and a net register tonnage of 26 tons.

She was built as an ice breaking and harbour tug for the Goodrich Transportation Company. The Arctics hull was exceptionally strong and durable, this meant that she could not only work at the harbor, she also worked as a wreaking tug assisting stranded vessels stranded on shoals and/or stuck in ice. In the summer, the Arctic was stationed at Manitowoc, Wisconsin, and in the winter she was stationed at Milwaukee, Wisconsin.

In the summer of 1898 the Arctic  was taken to the Burger & Burger shipyard for a hull extension and complete overhaul. Her hull was extended by twelve feet.

November 18, 1919 the Arctic was towing the McMullen & Pitz dredge Algoma, along with two dump scows. The vessels encountered bad weather off Cleveland, Wisconsin, between Sheboygan, Wisconsin and Manitowoc, Wisconsin. Eventually, the Algoma was swamped by a large wave, and sank into  of water after her crew of five made it aboard the Arctic.

From 1923 to 1925 the Arctic was stationed at Chicago, Illinois. While in Chicago, she accompanied Goodrich steamers such as the Christopher Columbus and the Virginia.

Later history
As she aged, the Arctic required repair and overhaul more frequently. Eventually, the Goodrich Transportation Company realized that repairing the Arctic would cost more than a new tug. The Arctic was taken apart, and beached north of Manitowoc harbour. On January 17, 1930 the Arctic'''s enrollment documents were surrendered, declaring her abandoned.

In 1930 an article appeared in the Manitowoc Herald-Times talking about the Arctic:
To recount the items of service this craft has rendered throughout its life, would fill volumes-- its responses to the four blasts of vessels on the lake in need of help; its assistance to grounded boats; its welcome stream of water on dock property being destroyed by flames; its charges into ice jams that threatened destruction of boats and bridges; and breaking of ice that enabled navigation to continue—all are legion in number, and no man can recount them all.

The Arctic today
The southern section consists of the bilge, the boiler and the bilge. The northern section consists of a partially intact upper hull and the stempost. Her wreck lies near to the wreck of the steam barge Francis Hinton.

References

Maritime incidents in 1930
Shipwrecks on the National Register of Historic Places in Wisconsin
National Register of Historic Places in Manitowoc County, Wisconsin
Shipwrecks of Lake Michigan
Steamships of the United States
1881 ships
Tugboats on the Great Lakes
Shipwrecks of the Wisconsin coast
Ships built in Manitowoc, Wisconsin
Wreck diving sites in the United States